The National Parks Administration of Argentina is a public agency in charge of maintaining the network of national parks, created in 1934 to preserve the biological diversity and the cultural resources of the country. It is managed by the Ministry of Environment and Sustainable Development.

History
The administration was established in 1934 by the federal law Nº 12 103/34 as the National Parks Department, together with creating Argentina's second national park, Iguazú. The first one, Del Sur, now known as Nahuel Huapi, preceded the department's creation by 12 years.

References

External links

Government agencies established in 1934
National park administrators
National parks of Argentina